1 Canadian Mechanized Brigade Group (1 CMBG;) is a Canadian Forces brigade group that is part of the 3rd Canadian Division of the Canadian Army. Originally headquartered at CFB Calgary, it is currently based in CFB Edmonton in Alberta with two major units at CFB Shilo in Manitoba, and consists of eight Regular Force units.

History 
The brigade was established on 14 October 1953 in Europe.
1st Canadian Infantry Brigade created 14 October 1953
Redesignated 1st Canadian Infantry Brigade Group in October 1955
Redesignated 1 Combat Group in 1972
Redesignated 1 Canadian Brigade Group in 1976
Redesignated 1 Canadian Mechanized Brigade Group in 1992
In 1989 at the height of the Cold War the 1st Canadian Mechanized Infantry Division consisted of three brigades, one of them being the 1st Canadian Brigade Group.  It had the following structure:

 Headquarters at Calgary
 Lord Strathcona's Horse (Royal Canadians) – armoured reconnaissance
 1st Battalion, Princess Patricia's Canadian Light Infantry – mechanized
 3rd Battalion, Princess Patricia's Canadian Light Infantry – mechanized
 3rd Regiment, Royal Canadian Horse Artillery – self-propelled artillery
 1st Combat Engineer Regiment, Royal Canadian Engineers – light engineers
 408 Tactical Helicopter Squadron – light helicopter support

1 CMBG sent a contingent of approximately 200 personnel for Task Force Kandahar Headquarters for a nine-month rotation starting February 2009 and sent approximately 2500 personnel for the task force in September 2009 for a six-month tour.

Composition
The eight units that comprise 1 CMBG are:

1 CMBG is colocated with, and frequently operates alongside, three regular force units which are not part of the formation:

See also

 Military history of Canada
 History of the Canadian Army
 Canadian Forces
 List of armouries in Canada

References

External links 
 

Canadian Mechanized Brigade Groups